Halton Castle is a castle in Runcorn, Cheshire.

Halton Castle may also refer to:

 Halton Castle, Lancashire
 Halton Castle, Northumberland